The original members of Keep Running are Deng Chao, Angelababy, Li Chen, Chen He, Zheng Kai, Wong Cho-lam, and Wang Baoqiang. After season 1, Wang Baoqiang recorded his last episode  and has left the program to focus on his career but returned on season 3, episode 10 as a guest. In season 2, Bao Bei'er was a replacement for Wang Baoqiang but left at the end of the season as he was cast in Stephen Chow's Journey to the West II. Singer Lu Han then replaced Bao Bei'er from season 3 onwards. Dilraba Dilmurat replaced Angelababy in season 5 due to Angelababy's pregnancy. Due to scheduling conflicts, Dilraba left the show in season 6.
For season 7, Deng Chao, Chen He and Lu Han left due to scheduling conflicts, while Wong Cho-Lam left to focus on his family. Lucas from South Korean boy group NCT and its Chinese subunit WayV, Song Yuqi from South Korean girl group (G)I-dle and actors Zhu Yawen and Wang Yanlin replaced them in the new season. In Season 8, actors Zhu Yawen and Wang Yanlin left due to scheduling conflicts and they were replaced by singer Cai Xukun,  actor Sha Yi and comedian Guo Qilin. In Season 9, Guo Qilin wasn’t there due to scheduling conflicts but returned for the 9th episode as a guest.

Timeline

Cast

Current cast

Former cast

Relationships

Current relationships

Former relationships

References

Keep Running cast members
Keep Running